Cheffins is a surname. Notable people with the surname include:

Charles Cheffins (1807–1860), British mechanical draughtsman and consulting engineer
Craig Cheffins, former member of the Legislative Assembly of Alberta for the Calgary Elbow riding
Georgina Fanny Cheffins (1863–1932), English militant suffragette
Simon Cheffins, British/American percussionist